There are 241 listed buildings (Swedish: byggnadsminne) in Västra Götaland County.

Ale Municipality

Alingsås Municipality

Bengtsfors Municipality

Bollebygd Municipality

Borås Municipality

Dals-Ed Municipality

Essunga Municipality

Falköping Municipality

Färgelanda Municipality

Grästorp Municipality

Gullspång Municipality

Göteborg Municipality

Götene Municipality

Herrljunga Municipality

Hjo Municipality
There are no listed buildings in Hjo  Municipality.

Härryda Municipality

Karlsborg Municipality

Kungälv Municipality

Lerum Municipality

Lidköping Municipality

Lysekil Municipality

Mariestad Municipality
placeholder

Mark Municipality

Mellerud Municipality

Mölndal Municipality

Orust Municipality
There are no listed buildings in Orust  Municipality.

Partille Municipality

Skara Municipality

Skövde Municipality

Sotenäs Municipality

Stenungsund Municipality

Strömstad Municipality

Svenljunga Municipality

Tanum Municipality

Tibro Municipality
There are no listed buildings in Tibro  Municipality.

Tidaholm Municipality

Tjörn Municipality

Tranemo Municipality

Trollhättan Municipality

Töreboda Municipality

Uddevalla Municipality

Ulricehamn Municipality

Vara Municipality
placeholder

Vårgårda Municipality

Vänersborg Municipality

Åmål Municipality

Öckerö Municipality

External links

  Bebyggelseregistret

Listed buildings in Sweden